Madek Kasman (born 12 February 1937) is an Indonesian weightlifter. He competed in the men's featherweight event at the 1968 Summer Olympics.

References

External links
 

1937 births
Living people
Indonesian male weightlifters
Olympic weightlifters of Indonesia
Weightlifters at the 1968 Summer Olympics
Sportspeople from Medan
Medalists at the 1970 Asian Games
Asian Games silver medalists for Indonesia
Weightlifters at the 1970 Asian Games
Asian Games medalists in weightlifting
20th-century Indonesian people
21st-century Indonesian people
Indonesian sports coaches
Weightlifting coaches
National team coaches